SPD Nordrhein-Westfalen is a political party in German state North Rhine-Westphalia and is, with 97,300 members, the biggest state group of Social Democratic Party of Germany (SPD).

History

Election results

Landtag of North Rhine-Westphalia

Structure 
Regional organizations of SPD state group:{
 Region Westliches Westfalen (Western Westphalia), covering the Regierungsbezirke Arnsberg and Münster
 Region Niederrhein (Lower Rhine), covering the Regierungsbezirk Düsseldorf
 Region Mittelrhein (Central Rhine), covering the Regierungsbezirk Cologne
 Region Ostwestfalen-Lippe (Eastern Westphalia-Lippe), covering the Regierungsbezirk Detmold

The Regions are headgroups of 54 lower state groups (Unterbezirke), each covering either a district-free City (Kreisfreie Stadt) or a District (Kreis).

Chairman

References

Politics of North Rhine-Westphalia
North Rhine-Westphalia
State sections of political parties in Germany